This is a list of wars that Kurds rebels and subsequently the autonomous Kurdistan Region has been involved in, since the establishment of Iraq in 1932.

References